Patrick Gleason may refer to:

Patrick Gleason (politician) (1844–1901), American politician
Patrick Gleason (artist), American comic book artist
Patrick A. Gleason (born 1934), Pennsylvania politician
Pat Gleason (actor), actor in the 1940 film Brother Orchid